Carl R. Ohlson is an American politician.

He won election to the Massachusetts House of Representatives from the 10th Plymouth district in 1968, 1970 and 1972, then lost to Karen Swanson in the 14th Plymouth district during the 1974 election cycle.

References

Year of birth missing (living people)
Living people
20th-century American politicians
Republican Party members of the Massachusetts House of Representatives